Robert Dee Gibson Jr. (August 25, 1923 – April 8, 2003) was an American professional basketball player. He was selected in the 1948 BAA Draft by the Minneapolis Lakers. Gibson began his career for the Tri-Cities Blackhawks in the National Basketball League (NBL) in the 1948–49 season and stayed with the team when the NBL became the National Basketball Association (NBA) for the 1949–50 season. He then played in the short-lived National Professional Basketball League in 1950–51 for the Louisville Alumnites.  He played in college for Western Kentucky University.

References

1923 births
2003 deaths
American men's basketball players
Basketball players from Tennessee
Guards (basketball)
Forwards (basketball)
Minneapolis Lakers draft picks
People from Cleveland, Tennessee
Tri-Cities Blackhawks players
Western Kentucky Hilltoppers basketball players
Western Kentucky Hilltoppers tennis players